Tom Sawyer is a lost 1907 American silent film based on Mark Twain's 1876 novel The Adventures of Tom Sawyer made by Kalem Studios in New York City. It was the first time Twain's character appears on film.

Very little else is currently known about the film, other than the screenplay was written by Gene Gauntier, the first of over 300 screenplays she eventually wrote.

References

External links 
 

1907 films
American silent short films
American black-and-white films
Films about orphans
1907 drama films
Lost American films
Kalem Company films
Films based on American novels
Films based on The Adventures of Tom Sawyer
1907 short films
Silent American drama films
Films set in the 19th century
1900s lost films
Lost drama films
1900s American films